Geoffrey York is a Canadian journalist who works as the Africa correspondent for The Globe and Mail, based in Johannesburg.

Works

References

The Globe and Mail people
21st-century Canadian journalists
Living people
Year of birth missing (living people)